Pseudomelanioidea is an extinct superfamily of fossil sea snails, marine gastropod molluscs in the clade Caenogastropoda named after the family pseudomelaniidae.

Taxonomy
 † Family Pseudomelaniidae R. Hoernes, 1884
 † Family Trajanellidae Pchelintsev, 1951

References